Craig Theodore Nelson (born April 4, 1944) is an American actor. He is known for his roles as Hayden Fox in the sitcom Coach (for which he won a Primetime Emmy Award for Outstanding Lead Actor in a Comedy Series), Deputy Ward Wilson in the 1980 film Stir Crazy, Steve Freeling in the 1982 film Poltergeist, Burt Nickerson in All The Right Moves (1983), Peter Dellaplane in Action Jackson, Chief Howard Hyde in Turner & Hooch (1989), Alex Cullen in The Devil's Advocate (1997), Chief Jack Mannion in The District (2000–2004), The Warden in My Name is Earl, and the voice of Bob Parr/Mr. Incredible in the 2004 film The Incredibles and its 2018 sequel. He also starred as Zeek Braverman in the television series Parenthood.

Early life
Nelson was born Craig Theodore Nelson in Spokane, Washington, on April 4, 1944. He was the son of Vera Margaret (née Spindler; 1906–1971), a dancer, and Armand Gilbert Nelson (1900–1964), a businessman.

Nelson attended Lewis and Clark High School, where he played football, baseball, and basketball.

After high school, Nelson studied at Central Washington University. After flunking out, Nelson went to Yakima Valley College where he was inspired to study acting by his drama teacher, Mr. Brady. From Yakima, he went on to study drama at the University of Arizona on a scholarship.

In 1969, Nelson dropped out of school and moved to Hollywood to pursue an acting career. When he first moved to California, he took up a job as a security guard at a soap factory until finding work as a comedy writer.

Career
Nelson began his show business career as a stand-up comedian. He was an early member of The Groundlings improv and sketch comedy troupe. Nelson, Barry Levinson, and Rudy De Luca formed their own comedy team and were regular performers at The Comedy Store and on the short-lived The Tim Conway Comedy Hour (1970). In 1973, Nelson left the comedy world, explaining "the standup comedy life was pretty unfulfilling for me" and he settled in Montgomery Creek, California where there was no electricity and no running water; "it was contentment, The Waltons", he said. Nelson had different jobs during that time including janitor, plumber, carpenter, surveyor, and high school teacher in Burney, CA. He returned to acting five years later.

He was featured as a prosecuting attorney who opposes Al Pacino in the 1979 film ...And Justice for All, co-written by Levinson. In 1983, Nelson appeared in Silkwood, directed by Mike Nichols and starring Meryl Streep, as the high school football coach of Tom Cruise in the drama All the Right Moves and as one of the stars of director Sam Peckinpah's final film, The Osterman Weekend.

He has appeared in many other motion pictures (most notably the Poltergeist series) and had featured roles in five television shows (Coach, Call to Glory, The District, My Name Is Earl, and Parenthood). Coach ran from 1989 to 1997, with Nelson starring as college football coach Hayden Fox.

He provided the voice of Bob Parr (also known as Mr. Incredible) in the computer-animated superhero film, The Incredibles, and returned to the role for its sequel, Incredibles 2. Nelson also reprised the role again in the video games Kinect Rush: A Disney-Pixar Adventure and in the Disney Infinity video game series, except for the video game and The Incredibles: Rise of the Underminer, where he was replaced by actor Richard McGonagle.

Nelson made a three-episode guest appearance on CSI: NY as a "nemesis" of Gary Sinise's Taylor.

His latest films include 2009's The Proposal as Ryan Reynolds' skeptical father, 2010's The Company Men as a greedy CEO, and 2018's Book Club. From 2010 to 2015, he starred in the television show Parenthood as Ezekiel "Zeek" Braverman, the family patriarch. His production company is Family Tree Productions.

In 2017, Nelson joined the cast of Young Sheldon as Dale Ballard, a local sports store owner, Missy's baseball coach, and Meemaw's boyfriend.

Personal life
Nelson has three children from his previous marriage to Robin McCarthy. His second wife Doria Cook-Nelson is a freelance writer, president of a martial arts association, karate instructor, tai chi teacher and a former film and television actress who had a featured role in the movie musical Mame.

Nelson is a motorsports fan and an avid racer. He first participated in the 1991 Toyota Celebrity Long Beach Grand Prix and finished ninth. In 1992, he founded Screaming Eagles Racing with John Christie and entered and drove a Toyota-engined Spice SE90 in the IMSA 1994 WSC, a Lexus-engined Spice SE90 in 1995 and a Ford-engined Riley & Scott MkIII in the 1996 and 1997 championships.

Filmography

Film

Television

Video games

Theatre

Awards and nominations

References

External links

 
 
 Craig T. Nelson at Internet Off-Broadway Database

1944 births
20th-century American male actors
21st-century American male actors
American male film actors
American male television actors
American male voice actors
20th-century American comedians
21st-century American comedians
Central Washington University alumni
Living people
Male actors from Spokane, Washington
American male comedians
Outstanding Performance by a Lead Actor in a Comedy Series Primetime Emmy Award winners
Racing drivers from Washington (state)
Sportspeople from Spokane, Washington
University of Arizona alumni
24 Hours of Daytona drivers